Hase Spezialräder, also known as Hase Bikes, is a German tricycle, tandem and recumbent factory founded in 1994 in Bochum by Marec Hase.

Extraschicht, a yearly cultural event of the Ruhr region takes places, simultaneously with other locations, in the old Waltrop's mine building, now head office of the company.

Hase Bikes holds the Guinness Book of Records record for the longest tandem in the world, with 93 riders and more than 150m long.

References

External links

 Hase Bikes Corporate Site
 Velovision British Magazine Article
 From the manufacturer's website : Document of various international articles about Hase  Bikes (12,3 MB)
     North American sales and support

Companies based in North Rhine-Westphalia
Cycle manufacturers of Germany
Recklinghausen (district)